Air-laid paper is a textile-like material categorized as a nonwoven fabric made from fluff pulp.

Properties
Compared with normal wet-laid paper and tissue, air-laid paper is very bulky, porous and soft. It has good water absorption properties and is much stronger compared with normal tissue.

Main characteristics are:
 Soft, does not scratch.
 Non-linting, no dust, no static.
 Strong, even when wet, can be rinsed and reused.
 Clean, hygienic, can be sterilized.
 Textile-like surface and drape.
 Can be dyed, printed, embossed, coated and made solvent resistant.

Manufacture
Unlike the normal papermaking process, air-laid paper does not use water as the carrying medium for the fibre. Fibres are carried and formed to the structure of paper by air. The air-laid structure is isotropic.

The raw material is long fibered softwood fluff pulp in roll form. The pulp are defibrized in a hammermill. Defibration is the process of freeing the fibres from each other before entering the papermachine. Important parameters for dry defibration are shredding energy and knot content. Normally an air-laid paper consists of about 85% fibre. A binder must be applied as a spray or foam. Alternatively, additional fibres or powders can be added to the pulp which can then be activated and cured by heat.

History
The Danish inventor Karl Krøyer is considered to be the first who commercialized air-formed paper in the early 1980s. Others developed different processes independently at about the same time. A Finnish company United Paper Mills(now UPM-Kymmene Oyj) was one of the companies developing airlaid technology in the 1980s. In the 1980s UPM formed a new company called Walkisoft Oy and also built an airlaid factory to Kotka Finland which started in 1985. Walkisoft built several plants around the world (including the world's largest airlaid-factory in Mt Holly, NC, USA) in the following 14 years before being sold to Buckeye Technologies Inc. The Walkisoft engineering team, which was responsible for the engineering and R&D of the airlaid machines, became known as Buckeye Engineering Finland and then, from 2002, as Anpap Oy, a private owned Finnish company.

Applications
 Disposable diapers as part of the inner absorbent
 Feminine hygiene
 Industrial wipes
 Personal care products
 Table top
 napkin
 tablecloth
 Wet wipes

References

Paper
Nonwoven fabrics